
Gmina Przygodzice is a rural gmina (administrative district) in Ostrów Wielkopolski County, Greater Poland Voivodeship, in west-central Poland.

The gmina contains part of the protected area called Barycz Valley Landscape Park.

Villages
Gmina Przygodzice contains the villages and settlements of Antonin, Antonin-Strugi, Bogufałów, Chynowa, Czarnylas, Dębnica, Hetmanów, Janków Przygodzki, Ludwików, Przygodzice, Przygodziczki, Smardów, Topola Wielka, Topola-Osiedle, Trzcieliny and Wysocko Małe.

Neighbouring gminas
Gmina Przygodzice is bordered by the town of Ostrów Wielkopolski and by the gminas of Mikstat, Odolanów, Ostrów Wielkopolski, Ostrzeszów, Sieroszewice and Sośnie.

References
Polish official population figures 2006

Przygodzice
Ostrów Wielkopolski County